The Golden Helmet is an annual speedway event in Poland. It has been organised by the Polish Motor Union (PZM) since 1961. The race is held with the top twelve riders in the Ekstraliga and the top four riders in the Polish Speedway First League. The winner receives a new Jawa motorcycle.

Previous winners

References

Polish Golden Helmet
Helmet Golden